Richard Rose (born 9 April 1933 in St Louis, Missouri) is an American political scientist who has been a professor of politics in Scotland since 1966. His research has included the Northern Ireland conflict, enlargement of the European Union, democratisation, policy transfer, elections and voting.

Education
Rose studied as an undergraduate at Johns Hopkins University. His doctorate at the University of Oxford, entitled The relation of socialist principles to British Labour foreign policy, 1945-51, was completed in 1960.

Academic career
From 1961 to 1966, Rose was lecturer in government at the University of Manchester.

Since 1966, he has been based in Scotland, mostly as professor of politics at the University of Strathclyde, where in 1976 he founded the Centre for the Study of Public Policy, of which he was director. However, from 2005 to 2011, he was at the University of Aberdeen where he held the sixth century chair in politics.

Rose is an honorary vice president of the Political Studies Association, which each year awards a prize in his name to a scholar under 40 years of age who has made a distinctive contribution to the study of British politics. Rose has an honorary doctorate from Örebro University in Sweden, a lifetime achievement award from the Policy Studies Organization, and a career award from the 
International Public Policy Association. 

He is a fellow, member, or honorary member of the American Academy of Arts and Sciences, the British Academy, the Finnish Academy of Science and Letters, the Academy of Learned Societies for the Social Sciences, and the Royal Society of Edinburgh.

References

Further reading

External links
Homepage at the University of Strathclyde
Homepage at the Centre for the Study of Public Policy

1933 births
Academics of the University of Aberdeen
Academics of the University of Strathclyde
Alumni of Lincoln College, Oxford
Alumni of Nuffield College, Oxford
American political scientists
Johns Hopkins University alumni
Living people